The mixed 2000 metre relay competition in short track speed skating at the 2022 Winter Olympics was held on 5 February, at the Capital Indoor Stadium in Beijing. This will be the first time a mixed short track speed skating event is featured at the Olympics.

In July 2018, the International Olympic Committee (IOC) officially added the mixed relay to the Olympic program held over a distance of 2000 metres. Due to the addition of the event, the competition schedule was increased to six days from five.

China was favored after leading the 2021–22 ISU Short Track Speed Skating World Cup with four races completed before the Olympics, followed by the Netherlands and Hungary.

The Dutch team set an Olympic record in the quarterfinals, but after a fall finished last in their semifinal. South Korea did not advance to semifinals, also after a fall. In the semi-finals, the United States was disqualified for "blocking by infield skater" and the Russian Olympic Committee was disqualified  because of "extra team skater causing obstruction", after finishing second and fourth, respectively. This resulted in China, who finished third in their semifinal, having been promoted to Final A.

In Final A, Hungary and Canada crashed in the first turn, forcing the officials to call a restart. In the repeat, Italy and China were leading more than halfway through the race when Canada's Florence Brunelle and Hungary's Petra Jaszapati collided, with both sliding off the course. Both teams recovered to finish the race, but after review, Canada received a penalty for a push from behind and Hungary finished at third place.

China won gold ahead of a late sprint by Italy’s Pietro Sighel at the finish line.

Qualification

The top 12 countries qualified a relay through the 2021–22 ISU Short Track Speed Skating World Cup, including host nation China. If a county needed an additional quota spot to complete a relay, it was awarded an additional quota. Italy and the ROC were awarded an additional male athlete spot, while Kazakhstan and Poland were awarded an additional female spot.

Records
Prior to this competition, the existing world and Olympic records were as follows:

The following records were set during the competition:

Results

Quarterfinals

Semifinals

 QA – qualified for Final A
 QB – qualified for Final B
 PEN – penalty

Finals

Final B

Final A

Final ranking

References

Short track speed skating at the 2022 Winter Olympics
Mixed events at the 2022 Winter Olympics